The KRDK-TV mast is a television transmitting tower in Traill County, North Dakota, United States.  At 2,060 ft (627.8 m), it is currently the second-tallest structure in the Western Hemisphere and the eighth-tallest structure in the world. It stands 72.8 ft (22.2 m) taller than the nearby KVLY-TV mast in Blanchard, North Dakota, which was previously 3.3 ft (1.0 m) taller until the removal of a VHF antenna reduced its height in 2019.

Located 3.5 miles (6 km) northeast of Galesburg, North Dakota, the KRDK-TV mast was completed in 1966, to replace the station's previous mast, a 1,085-foot (331 m) tower 15 miles (25 km) northeast of Valley City, North Dakota (or southwest of Pillsbury) which was sold to KOVC, an AM radio station.

The KRDK-TV antenna has an effective radiated power (ERP) of 285,000 watts.  KRDK-TV (formerly KXJB-TV) is licensed to Valley City, serving the Fargo and Grand Forks TV markets.  The station and tower are owned by Major Market Broadcasting.

Collapses
The mast has fallen and been rebuilt twice.  The first collapse occurred at 9:08 A.M. February 14, 1968, when the rotor of a Marine helicopter severed some guy-wires; all four passengers aboard the helicopter were killed in the mishap.  The television station was off the air for eight days, finally resuming broadcasts from their previous (KOVC) tower.  A replacement mast of the same height as the one destroyed was completed in four and a half months.

The second mast fell during an ice storm which hit the area on April 6, 1997, subjecting it to wind gusts of 70 mph and causing at least four inches (100 mm) of ice to accumulate on the structure, resulting in the structure's failure at 6:09 P.M.. Cable programming was resumed by 8:34 and broadcasts by 3 P.M. the following afternoon through coordination with other affiliates; a 735-foot (224 m) temporary tower was completed and resumed broadcasts by July 10. This tower, known as KXJB-TV Mast 2, still stands next to the full-height mast.

Work began on replacement of the full-height mast with a more durably-built structure on April 1, 1998, and had reached the tower's previous height by July 30.  That day members of the construction crew affixed a four-foot (1.2 m) flagpole to the top of the tower, making the structure's height effectively 2064 ft (629 m), or one foot higher than the KVLY mast (the flagpole was later removed). Broadcasting for Channel 4 was switched to the new mast on August 15.

Gallery

Structures of similar height
 KVLY-TV mast (1,987 ft./605.6m)
 KXTV/KOVR Tower (2,049 ft./624.5 m)

See also
 List of tallest structures in the world
 KRDK-TV

References

External links

 
 
 
 Archive of page at Channel 4
 
 Entry of 224 metres tower close to main tower in FCC-database
 
 

Towers in North Dakota
Mass media in North Dakota
Buildings and structures in Traill County, North Dakota
Radio masts and towers in the United States
Towers completed in 1966
1966 establishments in North Dakota